Samuel Gordon Davie (7 July 1903 – 18 February 1941) was an Australian rules footballer who played with Collingwood in the Victorian Football League (VFL).

Notes

External links 

Gordon Davie's profile at Collingwood Forever

1903 births
1941 deaths
Australian rules footballers from Victoria (Australia)
Collingwood Football Club players